, was a Japanese popular singer and actress.

She started her singing career at the age of 14 with her version of "Tennessee Waltz." Her repertoire consisted largely of traditional Japanese songs as well as a few American songs such as "Jambalaya" and "Come on-a My House". Eri started her career as an actress similar to Hibari Misora. Eri, Misora and Izumi Yukimura formed a trio. In her concerts, she was supported by Nobuo Hara's jazz band. The actress was one of Japan's best-known singers in the mid-20th century and also appeared in numerous television shows from the early 1950s until just before her death. However, she is fairly unknown in many other parts of the world since her albums were rarely distributed in other markets, in which her music can almost only be accessed via the internet.

Eri married Ken Takakura in 1959 and they divorced in 1971. She released the single  in 1974. The song was later included in the omnibus album "Enka no Kokoro".

Death 
On the afternoon of February 13, 1982, Eri was found prone and not breathing on the bed of her Minato Ward apartment in Tokyo, by her manager. Her cause of death was listed as a stroke with asphyxiation due to vomit in the trachea. A further report indicated that while she had a cold and had already been drinking, a combination of whiskey mixed with milk, as well as cold medicine that she had heated up may have had a role in her death.

Discography 
Eri began her career as a singer at the age of 14 and would continue to record throughout her career. Many of her albums focused on Japanese folk music though she would often blend American standards with Latin grooves at the behest of Nobuo Hara, a prolific jazz musician and leader of Eri's backing band.

 江利チエミ - チエミの民謡集 / Eri Chiemi - Chiemi's Folk Song Collection (1958)
 チエミスタンダードアルバム　/ Chiemi Sings Standards (1959)
 Chiemi Eri & The Delta Rhythm Boys (1961)
 チエミの民謡ハイライツ / Chiemi Sings Japanese Folk Songs Highlights (1962)
 チエミの民謡ハイライツ 第2集 / Chiemi Sings Japanese Folk Songs Volume 2 (1965)
 チエミの民謡デラックス / Chiemi Sings Japanese Folk Music Deluxe (1968)
 チエミの民謡デラックス第二集 / Chiemi Sings Japanese Folk Music Deluxe Volume 2 (1969)

Filmography 
She acted in 51 films:

1950s 
(1950s complete)
 猛獣使いの少女 Mōjū tsukai no shōjo (1952)
 母子鶴 (1952)
 新やじきた道中 (1952)
青春ジャズ娘 Seishun Jazz musume (青春ジャズ娘) (1953)
 陽気な探偵 (1954)
 ハワイ珍道中 (1954)
 So Young, So Bright (ジャンケン娘 Janken musume) (1955)
 ジャズ娘乾杯 (1955)
 ジャンケン娘 (1955)
 裏町のお転婆娘 (1956)
 チエミの初恋チャチャ娘 (1956)
 チエミの婦人靴 (1956)
 大暴れチャチャ娘 (1956)
 花笠太鼓 (1956)
 Romantic Daughters (ロマンス娘 Romansu musume) (1956)
 サザエさん (1956)
 恐怖の空中殺人 (1956)
 歌う不夜城 (1957)
 Jazz musume tanjō (ジャズ娘誕生 Jazu musume tanjō) (1957)
 続・サザエさん (1957)
 On Wings of Love (大当り三色娘 Ōatari sanshoku musume) (1957)
 森繁の僕は美容師 (1957)
 青春航路 (1957)
 サザエさんの青春 (1957)
 ロマンス祭 (1958)
 サザエさんの婚約旅行 (1958)
 サザエさんの結婚 (1959)
 サザエさんの新婚家庭 (1959)
 サザエさんの脱線奥様 (1959)

1960s

1970s -1980s 
(1970s -1980s complete)
 幕末 (1970)
 喜劇　おめでたい奴 (1971)
 ちゃんばらグラフィティー　斬る！ (1981)
 巣立ちのとき　教育は死なず (1981)

Other songs 
 Blue Moon

References

External links 

Chimi Eri's profile by King Records

1937 births
1982 deaths
King Records (Japan) artists
Singers from Tokyo
Accidental deaths in Japan
Alcohol-related deaths in Japan
20th-century Japanese women singers
20th-century Japanese singers